Bukovje v Babni Gori is a small dispersed settlement in the Kozje region in eastern Slovenia. It lies in the Municipality of Šmarje pri Jelšah. The area is part of the traditional region of Styria. The municipality is now included in the Savinja Statistical Region.

Name
The name of the settlement was changed from Bukovje to Bukovje v Babni Gori in 1953.

References

External links
Bukovje v Babni Gori at Geopedia

Populated places in the Municipality of Šmarje pri Jelšah